Ewa Szelburg-Zarembina (10 April 1899, in Bronowice – 28 September 1986, in Warsaw) was a Polish novelist, poet and screenplay writer.

Biography
Best known as author of numerous works for children, between 1922 and 1979 she published dozens of novels for children and adults alike, as well as hundreds of short stories, poems and other works. Between 1968 and 1976 she also headed the Chapter of the Order of the Smile. During that time (together with Seweryna Szmaglewska) she also initiated a fund gathering program that eventually led to the construction of the Children’s Memorial Health Institute, the largest and most modern centre of paediatric care in Poland. In 1921, she married educator and writer  (1897-1942), divorced in 1926, and subsequently married teacher Józef Zaremba. She was buried in Nałęczów.

References 

1899 births
1986 deaths
19th-century Polish writers
19th-century Polish women writers
Recipients of the State Award Badge (Poland)